The 2007 Basingstoke and Deane Council election took place on 3 May 2007 to elect members of Basingstoke and Deane Borough Council in Hampshire, England. One third of the council was up for election and the Conservative Party stayed in overall control of the council.

After the election, the composition of the council was:
Conservative 31
Liberal Democrats 15
Labour 11
Independent 3

Background
The Conservative Party had run the council since the 2006 election and won an overall majority for the first time in 11 years after gaining a seat in a by-election in Buckskin from Labour in December 2006. In March 2007 the Conservatives also held a seat in a by-election in Rooksdown. This meant that the Conservative held 31 seats going into the election, compared to 15 Liberal Democrat, 11 Labour and 3 Independent councillors.

5 councillors stood down at the election, 3 Conservatives and 2 Liberal Democrats, Jonathan Curry, Terence Faulkner, Paul Findlow, Alex Green and John Wall. 20 seats were up for election, with the leader of the Conservatives on the council, Mark Ruffell, being unopposed in Upton Grey and the Candovers. Candidates stood from the Conservative, Liberal Democrat and Labour parties, as well as 2 independents.

Election result
The results saw the Conservatives stay in control with 31 seats, with no changes taking place in the political balance on the council. The Liberal Democrats remained on 15 seats, Labour on 11 and independents on 3 seats.

Ward results

References

2007
2007 English local elections
2000s in Hampshire